Fincherville is an unincorporated community in Butts County, in the U.S. state of Georgia.

History
A post office called Fincherville was established in 1895, and remained in operation until 1901. The community was named after John Lumpkin Fincher, a pioneer citizen.

References

Unincorporated communities in Butts County, Georgia
Unincorporated communities in Georgia (U.S. state)